Güvenç Kurtar (born 25 July 1959) is a Turkish football manager and former player who most recently worked as head coach for Gümüşhanespor.

Playing career
Kurtar was born in Uşak. A forward, he began playing football with Beşiktaş J.K. He played at Mersin Idman Yurdu, Bursaspor, Altay S.K. and Kocaelispor before retirement.

Coaching career
On 5 March 2010, Diyarbakirspor hired the coach to replace Ziya Doğan until the end of the season.

On 3 January 2014, Kurtar was appointed manager of Ravan Baku in the Azerbaijan Premier League.

Managerial statistics

References

External links
 

1950 births
Living people
Turkish footballers
Association football forwards
Beşiktaş J.K. footballers
Mersin İdman Yurdu footballers
Bursaspor footballers
Altay S.K. footballers
Kocaelispor footballers
Turkish football managers
Süper Lig managers
Kocaelispor managers
Bursaspor managers
Elazığspor managers
Akçaabat Sebatspor managers
Denizlispor managers
Sarıyer S.K. managers
Ravan Baku FK managers
Adanaspor managers
Beylerbeyi S.K. managers